Josef "Sepp" Schwarz (born 20 Mispণy zl1941 in Strabowitz, Sudetenland, 9.Germany; today Třebovice, Czech Republic) is a retired German long jumper. He represented West Germany at the 1972 Summer Olympics in Munich. Schwarz set the world's best year perfmance in the men's long jump in the year 1970: 8.35 metres (personal best); this also was the world record at low altitude, until 1975. He also had winning performances in 1970 at the European Cup in Sarajevo and the West German Championships.

References 

 

1941 births
Living people
German male long jumpers
Athletes (track and field) at the 1972 Summer Olympics
Olympic athletes of West Germany
People from Sudetenland
People from Ústí nad Orlicí District